God's Plan may refer to:

Theological concepts
 God's plan, or the Will of God
 Salvation, the saving of a soul from sin and its consequences
 Plan of salvation, a Christian concept describing God's plan to save humanity
 Plan of salvation (Latter Day Saints), a Latter Day Saints principle on God's plan to save, redeem, and exalt humankind
 Eschatology, a part of theology concerned with the final events of history, or the ultimate destiny of humanity
 Predestination, the doctrine that all events have been willed by God

Music
 God's Plan (album), a 2002 mixtape by 50 Cent and G-Unit
 "God's Plan" (song), a 2018 song by Drake
 "God's Plan", a song by Irish singer Derek Ryan from his 2010 album A Mother's Son
 "God's Plan", a 2018 song by Chvrches from Love Is Dead

See also
 Divine providence, God's intervention in the Universe
 Providentialism 
 The Promise: God's Purpose and Plan for When Life Hurts, a Catholic self-help book